The Bluffers is a 1915 American short film directed by  B. Reeves Eason.

Plot
The stories revolved around the inhabitants of the fictitious land of 'Bluffoonia' and their ongoing struggle against the evil tyrant 'Clandestino' and his plans to destroy the forest in which they live.

Cast
 Vivian Rich
 Gayne Whitman

External links

1915 films
1915 short films
American silent short films
American black-and-white films
Films directed by B. Reeves Eason
1910s American films